Bilsdale is a dale in the western part of the North York Moors in North Yorkshire, England. The dale is the valley of the River Seph, formed where Raisdale Beck joins Bilsdale Beck at the small village of Chop Gate in the north of the dale. The river flows south to meet the River Rye at Seph Mouth.

The dale is divided between two civil parishes and districts.  The upper part of the dale comprises the civil parish of Bilsdale Midcable in the district of Hambleton.  The lower part of the dale is in the civil parish of Hawnby in the district of Ryedale.

History 
The place-name is derived from an Old Norse personal name Bildr, and so means "Bildr's valley".

In the 12th century the northern part of the dale was granted to Kirkham Priory, and the southern part to Rievaulx Abbey.  Bilsdale Rievaulx was itself divided by the River Seph.  The part to the west of the river became the township of Bilsdale Westside in the parish of Hawnby.  The part to the east became part of the township of Bilsdale Midcable, which also included Bilsdale Kirkham, in the parish of Helmsley.  An area above Laskill became a separate township of Helmsley parish, known as Laskill Pasture.  At the Dissolution both Bilsdale Kirkham and Bilsdale Rievaulx were granted to Thomas Manners, Earl of Rutland.  His successors sold the estate in 1687 to the Duncombe family.

In the 19th century jet was extensively mined in the dale.

The townships of Bilsdale Westside, Bilsdale Midcable and Laskill Pasture became separate civil parishes in 1866.  Bilsdale Westside and Laskill Pasture became part of the new Ryedale District in 1974, and were subsequently absorbed into the civil parish of Hawnby. The main settlements in the dale are Chop Gate, Fangdale Beck and the ancient hamlet of Urra.

In 1969, Bilsdale transmitting station was erected above the dale on Bilsdale West Moor.

References 

Valleys of the North York Moors